Jesse Saunders (born March 10, 1962) is an American house music artist, DJ, record producer, film producer, and entrepreneur. His 1984 single, "On & On", co-written with Vince Lawrence, was the first record with a house DJ as the artist that was pressed and sold to the public. Since his emergence as a DJ, Saunders has run several of his own independent labels, and worked extensively in music and film production, as well as artist promotion and management. He is also a long-time member of the National Academy of Recording Arts and Sciences.

Early years
Saunders was born and grew up on the south side of Chicago, Illinois in the 1960s and 70s. He attended St. Columbanus for Kindergarten and Reavis Elementary School until 5th grade where his mother, Lois M. Saunders, was a teacher. A Roosevelt University graduate in Early Childhood Education, she was his primary caregiver and a supporter of his sporting and music pursuits. Jesse Saunders then enrolled in Shoesmith Elementary School. At Shoesmith, he was a straight-A student and creatively gifted, and was selected to participate in the gifted program at Ray Elementary School. There, Saunders learned to program and operate computers at the age of 10. He was also selected to perform and tour in the Chicago Children's Choir.

Saunders eventually graduated from Charles S. Deneen Public School, then went on to study and graduate at Hyde Park's Kenwood Academy. In there, he played intramural tennis, leading his team to three City of Chicago Championships and 1 runner-up, earning him the 3 white letters that he wore on his lettermen's jacket.  During this time, he was selected by the city of Chicago's "Youth Action" program for training exceptional student athletes into professional athletes.

During his high school years at Kenwood Academy, where he was an honor student, he was mentored by his older stepbrother, DJ Wayne Williams, in the art of DJing. Bringing Saunders into the fold of his Chosen Few Disco Corp. in 1977, the two went on to produce the Chosen Few House Music Reunion Picnic yearly (since 1991) in Chicago to a crowd of over 30,000.

Saunders went on to study Communications and Film at the University of Southern California in Los Angeles.

Saunders's interest in music began with studying piano at age five, eventually making his way through every instrument available to him. Amongst his early musical influences were Aretha Franklin, Fleetwood Mac, Smokey Robinson, and Earth Wind & Fire.

Career

Chicago house
House music first got its start within the walls of Chicago's Warehouse nightclub, thus attaining its name. As the music moved to the wider community, the sound significantly changed and what developed is house music as it eventually came to be known.
While one of his biggest influences, and another instrumental figure in the development of house, Frankie Knuckles, confined himself to the gay nightclub scene (primarily the Warehouse), Saunders took the unique sounds of the Windy City to the masses. Instead of relying solely on disco and R&B like Knuckles, Saunders expanded his musical repertoire and fused it with the turntable trickery that remains a staple to this day. As a DJ, he would accentuate desired moments in songs through loops and repetition, focusing on sections that were stripped down to just the drum or bass – a tradition he would carry on as a producer.

Touring
At the age of sixteen, Saunders was exposed to Chicago's night club scene through the music of Frankie Knuckles and others in the scene. In 1982, he opened up his own nightclub, the Playground. Attendance figures soon outnumbered the Warehouse's and Saunders used the opportunity to incorporate his original material into his sets.

By 1983 he was producing his own music and in early 1984 he released the first official house music record along with Vince Lawrence, "On & On", on the label they made together, Jes Say Records. Saunders composed the track with Lawrence in order to replace a record which had been stolen from Saunders's collection, the "On & On" bootleg disco megamix by Mach (1980). That megamix, a pastiche of loops from several disco records, particularly the bassline from Player One's "Space Invaders" (1979) and Lipps Inc's "Funkytown" (1980), had been Saunders's "signature" tune as a DJ; it was one that other DJs in the city didn't have or didn't play. Saunders & Lawrence added hypnotic lyrics and electronic instruments, utilizing a Roland TR-808 drum machine as electronic percussion as well as a Korg Poly-61 synthesizer and Roland TB-303 bass synthesizer.

"Funk U Up" (the first house track to ever make it onto the Billboard charts), "Real Love", "Love Can't Turn Around", and "Dum Dum" soon followed. His group, Jesse's Gang was eventually signed to Geffen Records, releasing the album Center of Attraction shortly after, with the single off the album, "I'm Back Again" becoming a top ten club hit.

By the late 1980s, Saunders decided to focus all his efforts on writing, producing, and remixing instead of DJing. Throughout the 1990s, he made his way back to DJing, touring the world, as well as trying his hand at producing music for television. His independent label, Broken Records, embraced the digital revolution by distributing music solely via the Internet. Since 1991 he has been involved in House Music Reunion Picnic, celebrated every Fourth of July weekend. The event brings together over 100 DJs and attracts upwards of 30,000 people. In 1997 he reunited with the other forefathers of house music to release Chicago Reunion Album.

Saunders went on to be featured in a number of books including What Kind Of House Party Is This? by Jonathan Fleming (MixMag) and his own semi-autobiography House Music...The Real Story, co-written by James Cummins. He has co-starred in documentaries including the Sun Dance award-winning "Modulations", the Channel 4 (London) mini-series "Pump Up The Volume", the BBC audio documentary "The 2nd Summer of Love", the TV1 Unsung: "Frankie Knuckles and The Roots of House", the Channel 4 (London) "I Was There (When House Took Over The World)", the BBC "Can You Feel It", and the award-winning "Put The Needle on the Record".  He has been featured in Rolling Stone, MixMag, Urb, and Keyboard. Saunders has lectured at The Red Bull Academy, Oxford University, Boston University, The Winter Music Conference (Miami), Popkom (Germany), The New Music Seminar (New York), and the Amsterdam Dance Event (Holland).

In 2004 after touring the world, Saunders revived his Broken Records label. The label releases digital content many major download sites and features artists such as Inaya Day, Scott Langley, Sound Syndicate, Igor Garnier, Didier Vanelli, Mia Calderon, Joe Smooth, Marshall Jefferson, and Jesse Saunders himself.

In 2009, Saunders released the album 25th Anniversary of House Music, which resulted in a worldwide tour featuring Art depicting the culture and pioneers of the genre.  The tour hit all over the US and as far as Johannesburg, South Africa.

After the 25th anniversary of House Music Tour, Saunders founded the Electronic Music Cafe in Vegas 2010 to display the Art from the Tour. It has turned into a major broadcast network featuring DJs and fine artists interpreting their music.  He also founded the Music & Arts Society, a non-profit entity for the advancement and preservation of the DJ culture, with the launch of the word's first DJ Culture exhibit entitled "SPIN – Evolution of the DJ", that same year. Mayor Goodman issued a proclamation during the red carpet ceremony for the highly publicized affair for his outstanding contributions to education and the culture of Las Vegas.

In that same year Saunders produced and released the first installment of the Above The Sound Cloud compilation series. He also produced and released the first Chilled & UnBroken compilation series, as well the internationally acclaimed DJ Divas album.

Personal life
His maternal grandfather, Robert H. Miller, a funeral business owner and founder of the National Funeral Directors and Mortician's Association, was voted "Mayor" of Bronzeville from 1937 to 1939. He also became heavily involved in the American civil rights movement, walking with Martin Luther King Jr. in the 1965 Selma to Montgomery marches, later erecting a statue in honor of King in Selma, Alabama. Miller also promoted the career of gospel singer Mahalia Jackson and owned and operated the Grand Ballroom, which showcased artists such as Cab Calloway and Count Basie.

Saunders married actress/musician Jazsmin Lewis in 1992. The couple divorced in 1998. He now lives in Las Vegas, Nevada.

Selected discography

Releases

 On & On (1984)
 Funk U Up (1984)
 Undercover (1984)
 Fantasy (1984)
 Dum Dum (1984)
 Real Love (1985)
 I Am The DJ (1985)
 Dum Dum 2 (1985)
 Love Can't Turn Around (1986)
 Back Up (1987)
 I'm Back Again (1988) #2 Billboard Dance Charts
 Sing Sing in the 90's (1990)
 House Trax, Vol. 1 (1991)
 Light My Fire (1992)
 Got Me Runnin (1993)
 I Just Want To (1993)
 Take Me Higher (1996)
 Yeah/Let Me Hear U (1997)
 12 Inches of Love (1998)
 Body Music (1999)
 Excited (2002)
 On & On (20th Anniversary of House-2003)
 Everybody (2004)
 Feelin Me (2005)
 Luv 2 Luv U (2008)
 House Muzik Album (2008)
 On & On (25th Anniversary Remixes-2009)
 What's This FX (2010)
 I Hear House Music (2011)
 House Music Buffet (2011)
 MainLine (2012)
 Now That We Found Love (2013)
 Sunshine (2016)
 Shout (2017)
 Kaleidoscope (2018)
 On & On (35th Anniversary Remixes)
 Higher (2019) #28 Billboard Dance Charts

Remixes

 Showdown – No Sovereign (1987)
 It's A Cold, Cold World – lNouveau (1988)
 Come Fly With Me – DJ Pierre (1990)
 My Girl – Kool Skool (1990)
 Vibeology – Paula Abdul (1991)
 We Want The Funk – Gerardo (1991)
 Set Me Free – Jermaine Stewart (1992)
 Where Do We Go – Simple Pleasure (1992)
 Double Good Everything – Smokey Robinson (1992)
 Damn It Feels Good – Geto Boyz (1992)
 What's It Take – Mellow Man Ace (1993)
 Stranger – Buzz Session (1994)
 Loving Tonight – Honey Vox (1994)
 Slide – El Debarge (1995)
 Baby Wants To Ride – Frankie Knuckles (1997)
 Turn It Out – Rick James (1999)
 Fuck It (I Don't Want You Back) (2002)
 Step In The Name of Love – R. Kelly (2003)
 Love Dealer - Ryan Brahms (2017)
 Pounder - VMS (2018)

Notes

1962 births
Living people
African-American musicians
Musicians from Chicago
American house musicians
House musicians
21st-century African-American people
20th-century African-American people